Thomas Matthias Weguelin (5 May 1809 – 5 April 1885) was an English Liberal Party politician who sat in the House of Commons between 1857 and 1880.

Life
Weguelin was the son of William A Weguelin of Weymouth Street, Portland Place, London, who was a Russia merchant in London. He had directorships of the London and Liverpool and Globe Assurance Co., the Bahia and San Francisco Railway Co., and the Trust and Loan Co. of Upper Canada. From 1853 to 1855 he was Deputy Governor of the Bank of England and from 1855 to 1857  the Governor. He was a J.P. for Surrey.

Weguelin was elected as Member of Parliament (MP) for Southampton at a by-election in February 1857. He was re-elected at the general election in April 1857, but was defeated at the 1859 general election. He was returned to the Commons after a two-year absence at a by-election in July 1861 for Wolverhampton, and held that seat until he retired from Parliament at the 1880 general election.

Weguelin died at the age of 75.

Family
Weguelin married firstly in 1837 Charlotte Poulett-Thomson, daughter of A. H. Poulett-Thomson. She died in 1840 and he married secondly in 1844, Catherine Hammersley, daughter of Charles Hammersley.

References

External links

1809 births
1885 deaths
British bankers
Liberal Party (UK) MPs for English constituencies
UK MPs 1852–1857
UK MPs 1857–1859
UK MPs 1859–1865
UK MPs 1865–1868
UK MPs 1868–1874
UK MPs 1874–1880
Deputy Governors of the Bank of England
Governors of the Bank of England
19th-century English businesspeople